Gföhl is a town and municipality in the district of Krems-Land in the Austrian state of Lower Austria.

Population

Karl Simlinger controversy

The acting mayor of Gföhl, Karl Simlinger, stated at city council meeting that journalists who report on asylum seekers should be hanged.

References

Cities and towns in Krems-Land District